Brandon Walkin (born 16 August 1994) is an Australian tennis player.

Walkin has a career high ATP singles ranking of 702 achieved on 17 February 2020. He also has a career high ATP doubles ranking of 316 achieved on 2 March 2020.

Walkin made his ATP main draw debut at the 2022 Adelaide International 2 after receiving a wildcard into the doubles main draw with Harry Bourchier.

Career

2013–2017: Career beginnings on ITF and Challenger Tour
Walkin made his ITF debut in March 2013 at the Australia F4, where he made the second round. It was his only singles tournament of the year.

In 2014 and 2015, Walkin played on the ITF in Australia and Europe, with the second round being he best performance in singles and semi-finals in doubles.

In September 2016, Walkin reached the quarter final of the Australia F5.

In October 2016, Walkin debuted on the ATP Challenger Tour after he qualified for Traralgon ATP Challenger.

In February 2017, Walkin reached his first ITF finals in doubles in Anning, China. Walkin also won his first ITF title in Anning, China, partnered with Thomas Fancutt. 
Walkin played his last match on the ITF circuit in April 2017 for almost two years.

2019–2021 
In February 2019, following a two year injury lay off, Walkin played his first match on the ITF circuit since April 2017 and throughout 2019, made 8 ITF doubles finals. 
In May 2019, Walkin reached his first singles ITF final in M15 Cancun, which saw him re enter the ATP top 1000 rankings.
Walkin returned to Australia and played several ITF and challenger events, finishing 2019 with a singles ranking of 782 and a doubles rank of 334. Walkin also competed in the Australian Open Wildcard Playoffs in 2019 losing to eventual winner J.P Smith

Walkin commenced 2020 playing in the North American ITF Circuit, achieving a semi final run at Cancun, Mexico, before the Covid-19 pandemic stopped play in March 2020.

2022: ATP debut
Walkin commenced 2022 at the 2022 Traralgon International following yet another injury lay off. He reached the second round. Walkin made his ATP Tour debut at the 2022 Adelaide International 2, playing doubles alongside Harry Bourchier. Walkin also competed in the singles qualifying event.

ITF Circuit finals

Singles: 1 (0 title)

Doubles: 14 (8 titles)

References

External links

1994 births
Living people
Australian male tennis players
Tennis players from Brisbane